Joy Hathaway (born Joy Meeker; ? – November 4, 1954) was a Canadian-born American actress on stage, old-time radio, and television.

Early years 
The daughter of Mr. and Mrs. H. C. Meeker, Hathaway was from Vancouver, British Columbia. She was educated at Victoria Normal School and graduated from the University of British Columbia, where she acted in productions of the Varsity Players Club.

Career
Hathaway sang in operettas by Gilbert and Sullivan. On Broadway, she portrayed Mrs. Ritter in A Slight Case of Murder (1935), a fitter in The Women (1936), and an usherette in The Fabulous Invalid (1938).

Hathaway's work on radio included the roles shown in the table below.

She also had roles on Young Widder Brown, True Story Tales of Tomorrow, Modern Romances, and Seth Parker.

In 1953, Hathaway was the model for a statue of Sister Thérèse Couderc. Sculptor Pietro Montana created the life-size sculpture of the nun, who was being considered for canonization.

Personal life 
Hathaway was married to composer Charles Kenny.

Death 
On November 5, 1954, Hathaway died at age 41 of pneumonia in a hospital in Vancouver. Her death came three hours after the funeral for her three-week-old daughter, who also died of pneumonia.

References 
 

1954 deaths
20th-century American actresses
American musical theatre actresses
American radio actresses
American stage actresses